The 1980–81 South-West Indian Ocean cyclone season was an average cyclone season.

Season summary

Systems

Intense Tropical Cyclone Alice–Adelaide 

On November 3, a low-pressure area developed off the southwest coast of Sumatra in the Australian basin. The BoM upgraded the low to Tropical Cyclone Alice two days later, which was intensifying while moving west-southwestward, steered by the subtropical ridge to its south. While in the region, the cyclone's high waves capsized two boats. The crew of the Sing Long No. 21 escaped in two life rafts; a freighter rescued one raft, but the other was lost, with 12 crew members aboard.

Cyclone Alice crossed 90º E on November 9, and 85º E a day later, whereupon the MMS renamed the storm as Adelaide, estimating winds of at least . Adelaide soon began a weakening trend, falling below tropical cyclone status on November 11. A day later, the storm turned to the west-northwest, steered by a ridge to the south. Adelaide weakened to a tropical depression on November 13, and was no longer classifiable a tropical cyclone by a day later.

Moderate Tropical Storm Bettina 

Bettina formed on November 22, over the central Indian Ocean. It made landfall as a tropical storm over Mozambique and weakened shortly after on December 1.

Tropical Cyclone Bert–Christelle 

Formed on November 24 over the open Indian Ocean it moved in a mostly southwest direction, though it did curve a few times. Christelle made landfall on Madagascar on December 9 as a tropical depression.

Moderate Tropical Storm Diana 

Diana existed from December 7 to December 19.

Moderate Tropical Storm Edwige 

Edwige brushed Madagascar.

Very Intense Tropical Cyclone Florine 

Toward the beginning of January, the ITCZ was active to the northeast of Madagascar, spawning a circulation east of Agalega that became a depression on January 3. On the next day, the system was named Florine. Steered between a ridge to its northwest and northeast, the system moved erratically until January 5, when Florine began a steady movement to the south and later southwest. The change in trajectory was because the ridge to Florine's northeast had weakened. A day later, the outer eyewall of Florine moved across Réunion island, while the center of the eye passed 25 km east of Sainte-Rose. A landfall was spared due to a shift in trajectory to the south-southeast caused by a passing cold front. Florine weakened as it accelerated ahead of a polar trough, and was no classifiable as a tropical cyclone on January 10. The remnants passed west of Île Amsterdam on the next day and continued southeastward.

Florine's close passage to Réunion caused injuries to two people. High tides reached  at the coast in La Possession. Cyclone Florine destroyed crops and 95 houses. It caused injuries to two people and left around 500 people homeless. The storm knocked down 2000 phone lines and caused disruptions to the power network. Cilaos and Salazie became isolated during the storm, requiring assistance by helicopter.

Moderate Tropical Storm Gaelle 

Gaelle existed from January 14 to January 18.

Moderate Tropical Storm Helyette 

On January 31, Tropical Depression Helyette passed north of Rodrigues, and the next day moved over Mauritius and just southeast of Réunion. Helyette made landfall in Madagascar.

Severe Tropical Storm Iadine 

Iadine also made landfall in Madagascar.

Severe Tropical Storm Johanne 

Johanne existed from March 1 to March 11.

Moderate Tropical Storm Klara 

Klara existed from March 28 to April 8.

Moderate Tropical Storm Lisa 

Lisa existed from April 6 to April 16.

For several days, Lisa looped to the north of the Mascarene Islands, coming within  of Mauritius on April 9. Flooding caused road damage in the latter island.

See also 
 Atlantic hurricane seasons: 1980, 1981
 Eastern Pacific hurricane seasons: 1980, 1981
 Western Pacific typhoon seasons: 1980, 1981
 North Indian Ocean cyclone seasons: 1980, 1981

References 

 
South-West Indian Ocean cyclone seasons
1980–81 Southern Hemisphere tropical cyclone season
Tropical cyclones in 1980
Tropical cyclones in 1981